George VanderBurg (born February 15, 1957) is a Canadian politician, who formerly represented the electoral district of Whitecourt-Ste. Anne in the Legislative Assembly of Alberta. He was a member of the Progressive Conservative Party.

VanderBurg won his third term in office by defeating Link Byfield in the 2008 Alberta general election. He served as Minister of Seniors and Community Supports in the Alberta government, appointed in 2011, succeeding Mary Anne Jablonski. Vanderburg lost his seat in May 2015 to NDP candidate, Oneil Carlier.

Electoral history

References

External links 
 Profile at the Legislative Assembly of Alberta

1957 births
Living people
Mayors of places in Alberta
Progressive Conservative Association of Alberta MLAs
People from Edson, Alberta
People from Whitecourt
Members of the Executive Council of Alberta
21st-century Canadian politicians